Drover's Tavern, also known as Travelers' & Drovers' Tavern, is a historic brick building in Oran, New York.  According to HABS documentation, it was built in 1825 by Elisha Stanley.

An original sign at the stable end of the tavern reads ENTERTAINMENT FOR TRAVELERS AND DROVERS.

It was listed on the National Register of Historic Places in 2003.

See also
Atwell's 1928 Cazenovia, Past & Present: A Descriptive and Historical Record of the Village for its discussion of drovers and taverns that describes this or another nearby upstate New York area.

References

External links

Historic American Buildings Survey in New York (state)
Buildings and structures in Onondaga County, New York
Taverns in New York (state)
National Register of Historic Places in Onondaga County, New York
Taverns on the National Register of Historic Places in New York (state)